Pleasant Creek Wildlife Management Area is located near Philippi, West Virginia in Barbour and Taylor counties.

Hunting and fishing

Hunting opportunities in Pleasant Valley WMA include deer, bear, grouse, squirrel, rabbit, turkey and waterfowl.

Fishing in the  Tygart Lake includes largemouth bass, smallmouth bass, walleye, channel catfish, flathead catfish, crappie, bluegill, white bass, rock bass, bullhead, yellow perch, and carp. In addition, rainbow trout is stocked in the lake tailwaters.

Game fish in Pleasant Creek include rock bass, smallmouth bass, white bass, bluegill, channel catfish, flathead catfish, crappie, muskellunge, sunfish, and walleye.

A boat ramp is available at Tygart Lake. Doe Run Impoundment is limited to electric motors only. Forty (40) rustic camping sites for tents or trailers are available in the WMA.

Shooting range
As of December 2011, the Pleasant Creek WMA has a  shooting range with 8 covered benches. Shooters are responsible for bringing their own targets and target holders. The range is open year-round to anyone who wishes to use it and is open during all daylight hours Monday through Saturday as well as from 1PM until dusk on Sundays so as not to disturb local religious activities.

See also

Animal conservation
List of West Virginia wildlife management areas
Tygart Lake State Park

References

External links
West Virginia DNR District 1 Wildlife Management Areas
West Virginia Hunting Regulations
West Virginia Fishing Regulations

Wildlife management areas of West Virginia
Protected areas of Barbour County, West Virginia
Protected areas of Taylor County, West Virginia